David Campbell (born June 23, 1977) is an American athlete and musician known for performances on the Japanese program, Sasuke and its USA equivalent, American Ninja Warrior. He is one of only two people to have competed on every single season of American Ninja Warrior as of 2021.

Career 
Campbell (デイヴィッド・キャンベル) started his Ninja Warrior career winning the fourth American preliminary competition, the American Ninja Challenge, and earning a place in Sasuke 22. In Japan, he failed the first stage, making it to 'the rope ladder' (the final obstacle) before timing out. That year, Campbell made it farther than all other American competitors and Japanese All-Stars.

Campbell tried out in the first American Ninja Warrior, clearing the first two stages with one of the top times. During boot camp, he committed a rules infraction on one of the beach obstacles, and while it was noted that several other competitors got away with the same infraction, he was forced to redo the obstacle and lost a qualifying spot for Sasuke as a result. His nephew, Travis Furlanic, did qualify, ultimately failing at the Jumping Spider in Japan.

In order to practice for future competitions, Campbell built a replica of the entire first stage as well as several second and third stage obstacles in his backyard. Campbell's course was featured on G4's Attack of the Show, Men's Health, and on TruTV.

In American Ninja Warrior 2, Campbell made it out of Boot Camp with a qualifying spot. In Sasuke 26, cleared the First Stage with the fastest time (21.51 seconds). He then went on to clear Stage 2 with 23.4 seconds. In Stage 3, he slipped while transferring to the fourth ledge of the Ultimate Cliffhanger. Again, he performed better than all other Americans in the competition.

In American Ninja Warrior 3, Campbell qualified for Sasuke 27. In the First Stage, he had the fastest time, finishing with over 44 seconds left on the clock (setting a SASUKE speed record). Campbell made it to the third stage, where he slipped on the sixth and final ledge of the Ultimate Cliffhanger. Although it is often stated on the program that this is the farthest any American had ever gone on the Sasuke course, it is not accurate. Actor/martial artist Kane Kosugi reached the final stage in Sasuke 8.

In 2012, Campbell competed in the fourth American Ninja Warrior tournament. He qualified with the fastest run during the Northwest qualifiers, with a time of 58.55 seconds. Both he and Furlanic earned spots in the ANW finals in Las Vegas, Nevada; however Furlanic did not compete at the finals. Campbell failed on the Spinning Bridge in Stage 1 of the finals.

In 2013, Campbell competed in the fifth "American Ninja Warrior" in Venice Beach Qualifying, and got 3rd place. In the Venice Beach Finals, he was one of four competitors to complete the whole course.

In 2014, he competed in the sixth season and got the fastest times in both Venice Beach Qualifying and Finals, and also he was one of four people that completed Cannonball Alley, one of the most toughest city finals obstacles in history of American Ninja Warrior. In the Vegas finals, he failed Stage 1 for the third time in a row where he failed the Silk Slider.

In 2015, he led a Team USA All-Star team into an all-star game versus Team China on X Warrior (lit. Ultimate Warrior), a Chinese gameshow like American Ninja Warrior.

In 2016, Campbell completed all four stages of Mount Midoriyama in Sasuke Việt Nam, unofficially becoming the third American to achieve what is known as "Total Victory" after Geoff Britten and Isaac Caldiero completed the course on the seventh season of American Ninja Warrior. However, he had less success in America, finishing 17th in the Oklahoma City Finals and failing to make it to the National Finals in Las Vegas for the first time in his Ninja Warrior career.

In 2017, Campbell competed in Los Angeles and barely qualified for the City Finals, finishing in 27th out of 30 qualifying competitors. Later, in the City Finals, Campbell advanced to the Vegas Finals, barely making the cut in 15th out of 15, after Grant McCartney failed to qualify. At the National Finals, Campbell completed Stage 1 for the first time in six seasons. He later fell on the fifth obstacle on Stage 2, Wingnut Alley.

In 2018 on American Ninja Warrior 10, he returned in Los Angeles and where he completed both the Qualifying and Finals Course. In Vegas, he once again failed Stage 1 on the Double Dipper.

In 2019 on American Ninja Warrior 11, he returned stronger than ever in Los Angeles, placing 2nd in Qualifying where he competed on the Power Tower for the most chased after prize for qualifying: the Speed Pass. He ultimately lost that battle to the Lizard, Hunter Guerard but in the LA finals he placed 5th place out of the Top 12 allowing him to go back to the national finals for the third straight year with the other three Originals: Lorin Ball, Ryan Stratis, & Brian Kretsch until his ultimate time out on Stage 1 on the Twist & Fly on the second set of handles.

Personal life
Campbell resides currently in Santa Cruz, California where he trains on obstacles he built himself in his own backyard. He is a pizza delivery man for a local pizza place and a vegan.

References

External links
 

1977 births
Living people
People from Scotts Valley, California
American male sprinters
Musicians from California
Sasuke (TV series) contestants
American Ninja Warrior contestants